Serangium is a genus in the lady beetle family (Coccinellidae). 

The genus was described by Blackburn in 1889, working in Australia. It had 45 described species in 2011, mainly from the Oriental Region.

In 2018, fossils of two species assigned to the genus, S. twardowskii and S. gedanicum, were described from Baltic amber of Eocene age.

Serangium maculigerum, the citrus whitefly ladybird, is a predator of pest insects such as Orchamoplatus citri, the Australian citrus whitefly.

Species 

 extant
 S. japonicum
 S. maculigerum
 S. montazerii
 S. parcesetosum

 fossil
 S. gedanicum   (Szawaryn & Szwedo 2018)
 S. kalandyki   (Szawaryn 2019)
 S. twardowskii (Szawaryn & Szwedo 2018)

References 

Coccinellidae genera
Taxa named by Thomas Blackburn (entomologist)
Taxa described in 1889